Vangent, Inc., is a provider of healthcare information-technology and business systems to federal agencies. It has an $18.1 billion contract with the United States Office of Personnel Management  in connection with the Federal Employees Health Benefits Program.

References

Health care companies based in Virginia
Information technology companies of the United States